Anoto Group AB (formerly C Technologies) is a Swedish cloud-based software provider (SaaS). It primarily dispenses patented dot pattern technology which provides a methodology for accumulating digital big data from analogue inputs.

With around 45 employees, the company is headquartered in Stockholm and has offices in Seoul, London, Lisbon, Singapore and Boston.

Products

Digital Pen

Anoto's main product is the Anoto Digital Pen, a combination of ordinary ink pen and a digital camera that digitally records everything written with the pen. It works by recognizing a non-repeating dot pattern printed on the paper. The non-repeating nature of the pattern means that the pen is able to determine which page is being written on, and where on the page the pen is.

The dot pattern can be printed on a professional offset printing press or on a laser printer. Dots are printed in black; other colors of ink are invisible to the pen's IR sensor. On a color laser printer, CMY can be mixed to produce a near-black color that is human-readable. For offset printing, Anoto developed an ink color called "Anoto substitute black", a non-carbon-based black ink that is invisible in the IR region, allowing the user to include human-readable black marks with the dot pattern without interference.

While some of Anoto's licensees have targeted the consumer sector, with, for example, learning toys, most licensees sell their products to providers who put together customized vertical market systems. Anoto also sells a software development kit (SDK), numerous software applications, the Anoto Forms Solution (AFS). In addition, Anoto sells an ASIC design for the image processing component of the pen; most pen licensees use the same basic design of optical assembly and pen internals. Anoto has approximately 350 partners, primarily in Europe, the United States, and Japan.

Optical scan voting systems are based on Anoto technology.

Models include:
 Ericsson Chatpen CHA-30 (discontinued)
 Nokia SU-1B Digital Pen (discontinued)
 Nokia SU-27W (successor to SU-1B, rebranded Logitech io2 )
 Logitech io2 Digital Pen
 Logitech io Digital Pen (earlier version, discontinued)
 Maxell Digital Pen (an earlier version might have been discontinued)
 Hewlett-Packard Digital Pen 200 (discontinued) (rebranded Logitech)
 Hewlett-Packard Digital Pen 250
Fly (pentop computer)
Tag (LeapFrog)
 Livescribe Pulse Smartpen
 Livescribe Echo Smartpen
 Livescribe Sky WiFi Smartpen
 Anoto Digital Pen DP-201 (Live pen 1)
 Anoto Digital Pen io2 Bluetooth
 Anoto Digital Pen DP-301
 Polyvision Digital Stylus (DP-301)
 Anoto Live pen 2
Anoto Digital Pen AP-701
Livescribe Aegir Smartpen
Oxford Papershow

Anoto also has a few other products:

Anoto Forms includes all components required to set up and use digital pen and paper in order to capture, transfer, and incorporate handwritten information from paper forms into any back-end system. Anoto penDocuments Pro allows users to create electronic copies of handwritten documents. Anoto penPresenter is a personal digital whiteboard. By projecting a blank PowerPoint slide, a digital whiteboard is created.

C.AI 
Cognitive Artificial Intelligence is a cloud based AI program designed for offline education use. A digital pen aggregates and converts written analogue data on paper to digital data, and combined with a diagnostics assessment platform, enables an AI algorithm to recommend an individualized study plans.

aDNA 
Using Anoto's dot pattern, aDNA makes it possible to uniquely and unobtrusively mark physical objects and then easily identify those individual objects using ubiquitous mobile devices such as phones and tablets. aDNA is enabling possibilities for product innovation, marketing insights, and supply-chain control.

C-Pen
Anoto used to develop and sell the C-Pen, a one-line text scanner.

Patents
Anoto holds more than 300 international patents on their technology and some 300 additional patent applications.

In 2004, Anoto prevailed in a patent infringement lawsuit filed by Oral Sekendur regarding Anoto's dot-pattern technology. The Sekendur patent was held invalid.

In 2019, Anoto secured summary judgement against City Soft Limited and one of its directors for infringing on Anoto’s intellectual property.

See also 
Digital pen
Digital paper
 List of pen types, brands and companies

References

External links

Anoto company website
 Innovios Limited: example of private company using Anoto product
Habitualdata: Anoto Gold Partner in Spain
Digital Pen Corporation: Anoto Gold Partner in Europe

Information technology companies of Sweden
Computing input devices
Computer peripheral companies
Swedish brands